Ruth Garrett Millikan (born 1933) is a leading American philosopher of biology, psychology, and language. Millikan has spent most of her career at the University of Connecticut, where she is now Professor Emerita of Philosophy.

Education and career

Millikan earned her BA from Oberlin College in 1955. At Yale University she studied under Wilfrid Sellars. Although W. Sellars  left for the University of Pittsburgh midway through Millikan's doctorate, she stayed at Yale and earned her PhD in 1969.  She and Paul Churchland are often considered leading proponents of "right wing" (i.e., who emphasize Sellars’s scientific realism) Sellarsianism.

Millikan taught half-time at Berea College from 1969–1972, Two-thirds time at Western Michigan University from 1972–1973, half-time at the University of Michigan from 1993–1996, but otherwise spent her entire career at the University of Connecticut, where she is now professor emerita. She is married to American psychologist and cognitive scientist Donald Shankweiler.

She was awarded the Jean Nicod Prize and gave the Jean Nicod Lectures in Paris in 2002.  She was elected to the American Academy of Arts and Sciences in 2014. In 2017, she received both the Nicholas Rescher Prize for Systematic Philosophy from the University of Pittsburgh and the Rolf Schock Prize in Logic and Philosophy.

Philosophical work

Millikan is most famous for the view which, in her 1989 paper of the same name, she refers to as "biosemantics".  Biosemantics is a theory about something philosophers often refer to as "intentionality".  Intentionality is the phenomenon of things being 'about' other things, paradigm cases being thoughts and sentences.  A belief of mine that you will do my chores for me, for example, is about you and about my chores.  The same is true of a corresponding desire, intention or spoken or written command.

In general, the goal of a theory of intentionality is to explain the phenomenon – things being 'about' other things – in other, more informative, terms.  Such a theory aims to give an account of what this 'aboutness' consists in.  Just as chemistry offers the claim "Water is H2O" as a theory of what water consists in, so biosemantics aims for a constitutive account of intentionality.  Such an account, Millikan stresses, must deal adequately with such hallmarks of mentality as error, confusion, and what looks like standing in a relation (the 'aboutness' relation) to something that doesn't exist.  For example:  one 'sees' the stick is bent, but realizes otherwise after pulling it from the water; the inexperienced prospector thinks he's struck it rich, but he's holding a lump of pyrite ("fool's gold"); the field marshal thinks about the next day's battle, the child wants to ride a unicorn, and the phrase "the greatest prime" is somehow 'about' a number that cannot possibly exist (there's a simple proof for this).

As the name hints, Millikan's theory explains intentionality in terms that are broadly 'biological' or teleological. Specifically, she explains intentionality using the explanatory resources of natural selection:  what thoughts and sentences and desires are 'about' is ultimately elucidated by reference to what has been selected and what it has been selected for (i.e., what advantage it conferred on ancestors who possessed it). Where this selection is non-intentional, then what it is for is its 'proper function'.

Equally important is what might be called the co-evolution of producer-mechanisms and consumer-mechanisms.  Millikan refers to the intertwined selection histories of these mechanisms to explain the hallmarks of mentality and to offer a wide range of positions on various matters of dispute in the philosophy of mind and language.

In her article "Naturalist Reflections on Knowledge", Millikan defends the position that the justification of true beliefs through an explanation in accordance with evolution constitutes knowledge.

Publications

Books

 (1984) Language, Thought and Other Biological Categories
 (1993) White Queen Psychology and Other Essays for Alice
 (2000) On Clear and Confused Ideas pdf
 (2004) Varieties of Meaning: The 2002 Jean Nicod Lectures pdf
 (2005) Language: A Biological Model pdf
 (2012) Biosemantik Sprachphilosophische Aufsätze, six essays with a foreword, translated by Alex Burri, Surkamp Verlag
 (2017) Beyond Concepts: Unicepts, Language, and Natural Information

Note: the 1993, 2005 and 2012 books are collections of papers.

Other works

Millikan has also published many articles, many of which are listed and available here.

See also
 List of Jean Nicod Prize laureates
 American philosophy
 List of American philosophers

References

External links 
 Ruth Millikan's homepage at the University of Connecticut

1933 births
Living people
20th-century American philosophers
21st-century American philosophers
Analytic philosophers
American women philosophers
Philosophers of language
Philosophers of mind
Jean Nicod Prize laureates
Yale University alumni
University of Connecticut faculty
Philosophers of biology
Philosophers of psychology
Philosophers of science
University of Michigan faculty
20th-century American women
21st-century American women
Oberlin College alumni